The 2003 Breil Milano Indoor was a men's tennis tournament played on indoor carpet courts at the PalaLido in Milan in Italy and was part of the International Series of the 2003 ATP Tour. The tournament ran from 27 January through 2 February 2003. Martin Verkerk won the singles title.

Finals

Singles

 Martin Verkerk defeated  Yevgeny Kafelnikov 6–4, 5–7, 7–5
 It was Verkerk first singles title of his career.

Doubles

 Petr Luxa /  Radek Štěpánek defeated  Tomáš Cibulec /  Pavel Vízner 6–4, 7–6(7–4)
 It was Luxa's only title of the year and the 3rd of his career. It was Štěpánek's only title of the year and the 6th of his career.

References

External links
 ITF tournament edition details

Breil Milano Indoor
Milan Indoor
Breil Milano Indoor
Milan Indoor
Milan Indoor